N89 may refer to:

 , a submarine of the Royal Navy
 Joseph Y. Resnick Airport, in Ellenville, New York, United States
 London Buses route N89
 Nebraska Highway 89, in the United States